The 2019–20 FIA World Endurance Championship was the eighth season of the FIA World Endurance Championship, an auto racing series co-organised by the Fédération Internationale de l'Automobile (FIA) and the Automobile Club de l'Ouest (ACO). The series is open to Le Mans Prototypes and grand tourer-style racing cars divided into four categories. World Championship titles were awarded for LMP drivers, LMP1 teams, GTE drivers and GTE manufacturers. With the new winter scheduling format, the series began at Silverstone Circuit in September 2019 and ended with the 8 Hours of Bahrain in November 2020.

Schedule
The FIA and ACO announced a provisional schedule during the 2018 6 Hours of Silverstone which feature eight events over ten months.  All events from the previous season are carried over, as well as the return of Bahrain which was not on the 2018–2019 calendar, and Interlagos which last held a WEC event in 2014.  However, the length of the majority of events has been altered, moving away from the traditional six-hour format used in previous seasons.  Bahrain in an eight-hour race and  Silverstone and Shanghai are shortened to four-hour events.

After Formula 1 announced their provisional 2019 schedule, the WEC moved the Fuji round forward one week to 6 October to avoid a conflict with the Japanese GP. This also avoids a date conflict with the scheduled date for the IMSA season finale, Petit Le Mans. Moving the Fuji round forward also allowed the Shanghai round to be moved forward one week to 10 November, which avoids a conflict with the traditional date for the Macau GP. On 2 December 2019, it was announced that due to the failure of the promoter for 6 Hours of São Paulo to fulfill its contractual obligations to the championship, the round would be canceled, and instead replaced by the 6 Hours of Circuit of the Americas.  The FIA also moved the date back three weeks to avoid a clashing with Super Bowl LIV and the Mexico City ePrix.

The 1000 Miles of Sebring was scheduled for 20 March 2020, but was cancelled due to a travel ban to the U.S. from mainland Europe in response to the COVID-19 pandemic.  The 24 Hours of Le Mans was postponed to September due to the coronavirus. The 6 Hours of Spa-Francorchamps was postponed on 16 March. On 3 April 2020, a new revised calendar for the 2019–20 season was released, with the Spa race moved to 15 August and another 8 Hours of Bahrain event, on 21 November 2020, replacing the cancelled 1000 Miles of Sebring.  The final round at Bahrain in November was moved up a week as a result of Formula One scheduling a double header event at that venue for the end of the month.

Teams and drivers

LMP1

Note* The #3 Rebellion R13 entry only appeared at the first and seventh rounds of the season and was not classified as a full season entry not receiving points in the World Endurance LMP Drivers & World Endurance LMP1 Championship standings.

Note* The #4 ByKolles ENSO CLM P1/01 entry only appeared at the sixth and seventh rounds of the season and was not classified as a full season entry not receiving points in the World Endurance LMP Drivers & World Endurance LMP1 Championship standings.

LMP2
In accordance with the Le Mans Prototype LMP2 regulations all cars use the Gibson GK428 4.2 L V8 engine.

LMGTE Pro

LMGTE Am

Results and standings

Race results
The highest finishing competitor entered in the World Endurance Championship is listed below. Invitational entries may have finished ahead of WEC competitors in individual races.

Drivers' championships
Four titles are offered to drivers, two with world championship status. The LMP World Endurance Drivers' Championship is reserved for LMP1 and LMP2 drivers while the GTE World Endurance Drivers' Championship is available for drivers in the LMGTE categories. FIA Endurance Trophies are awarded in LMP2 and in LMGTE Am.

Entries were required to complete the timed race as well as to complete 70% of the overall winning car's race distance in order to earn championship points. A single bonus point was awarded to the team and all drivers of the pole position car for each category in qualifying. Furthermore, a race must complete two laps under green flag conditions in order for championship points to be awarded.

World Endurance LMP Drivers' Championship

World Endurance GTE Drivers' Championship

Endurance Trophy for LMP2 Drivers

Endurance Trophy for GTE Am Drivers

Manufacturers' and teams' championships
A world championship is awarded for LMGTE manufacturers and for LMP1 teams. FIA Endurance Trophies are awarded for LMP2 and LMGTE Am teams.

World Endurance LMP1 Championship
Points are awarded only for the highest finishing competitor from each team.

World Endurance GTE Manufacturers' Championship
The two highest finishing competitors from each manufacturer are awarded points.

Endurance Trophy for LMP2 Teams

Endurance Trophy for GTE Am Teams

References

External links
 

 
FIA World Endurance Championship seasons
World Endurance Championship
World Endurance Championship